The 2017–18 New York Rangers season was the franchise's 91st season of play and their 92nd season overall. This season saw the Rangers struggle with inconsistency for much of the season, with the team going 4–7–2 in October. Despite going 9–3–0 in November, the team's struggles would be amplified in later months with injuries to Mika Zibanejad, Chris Kreider and Kevin Shattenkirk, the latter of whom had season-ending knee surgery. After winning the 2018 Winter Classic over the Buffalo Sabres, the team would go 6–16–2 up to the trade deadline. On February 8, the Rangers announced their intention to rebuild, and then weeks later traded away many key players such as Ryan McDonagh, Rick Nash, J. T. Miller, Nick Holden, and Michael Grabner. They also acquired Rob O'Gara, Vladislav Namestnikov and Ryan Spooner. The Rangers ultimately missed the playoffs for the first time since the 2009–10 season, placed last in the Metropolitan Division and finished under .500 for the first time since the 2003–04 season. At the conclusion of the 2017–18 season, head coach Alain Vigneault was fired by the team.

Standings

Divisional standings

Conference standings

Schedule and results

Pre-season
The team's pre-season schedule was revealed on June 13, 2017.

|- style="background:#cfc;"
| 1 || September 18 || New York Islanders || 1–0  || 1–0–0
|- style="background:#cfc;"
| 2 || September 20 || New Jersey Devils || 4–3  || 2–0–0
|- style="background:#fcc;"
| 3 || September 22 || @ New York Islanders || 1–2 || 2–1–0
|- style="background:#fcc;"
| 4 || September 23 || @ New Jersey Devils || 1–2 || 2–2–0 
|- style="background:#cfc;"
| 5 || September 25 || Philadelphia Flyers || 3–2  || 3–2–0
|- style="background:#fff;"
| 6 || September 26 || @ Philadelphia Flyers || 3–4  || 3–2–1
|-

Regular season
The regular season schedule was made public on June 22, 2017.

|- style="background:#fcc;"
| 1 || October 5 || Colorado || 2–4 ||  || Lundqvist || Madison Square Garden || 18,006 || 0–1–0 || 0 || Recap
|- style="background:#fcc;"
| 2 || October 7 || @ Toronto || 5–8 ||  || Pavelec || Air Canada Centre || 19,621 || 0–2–0 || 0 || Recap
|- style="background:#cfc;"
| 3 || October 8 || Montreal || 2–0 ||  || Lundqvist || Madison Square Garden || 18,006 || 1–2–0 || 2 || Recap
|- style="background:#fcc;"
| 4 || October 10 || St. Louis || 1–3 ||  || Lundqvist || Madison Square Garden || 18,006 || 1–3–0 || 2 || Recap
|- style="background:#fcc;"
| 5 || October 13 || @ Columbus || 1–3 ||  || Lundqvist || Nationwide Arena || 15,342 || 1–4–0 || 2 || Recap
|- style="background:#fcc;"
| 6 || October 14 || New Jersey || 2–3 ||  || Pavelec || Madison Square Garden || 18,006 || 1–5–0 || 2 || Recap
|- style="background:#fff;"
| 7 || October 17 || Pittsburgh || 4–5 || OT || Lundqvist || Madison Square Garden || 18,006 || 1–5–1 || 3 || Recap
|- style="background:#fff;"
| 8 || October 19 || NY Islanders || 3–4 || SO || Lundqvist || Madison Square Garden || 18,006 || 1–5–2 || 4 || Recap
|- style="background:#cfc;"
| 9 || October 21 || Nashville || 4–2 ||  || Lundqvist || Madison Square Garden || 17,181 || 2–5–2 || 6 || Recap
|- style="background:#fcc;"
| 10 || October 23 || San Jose || 1–4 ||  || Lundqvist || Madison Square Garden || 18,006 || 2–6–2 || 6 || Recap
|- style="background:#cfc;"
| 11 || October 26 || Arizona || 5–2 ||  || Pavelec || Madison Square Garden || 18,006 || 3–6–2 || 8 || Recap
|- style="background:#fcc;"
| 12 || October 28 || @ Montreal || 4–5 ||  || Pavelec || Bell Centre || 21,302 || 3–7–2 || 8 || Recap
|- style="background:#cfc;"
| 13 || October 31 || Vegas || 6–4 ||  || Lundqvist || Madison Square Garden || 17,294 || 4–7–2 || 10 || Recap
|-

|- style="background:#cfc;"
| 14 || November 2 || @ Tampa Bay || 2–1 || OT || Lundqvist || Amalie Arena || 19,092 || 5–7–2 || 12 || Recap
|- style="background:#cfc;"
| 15 || November 4 || @ Florida || 5–4 || OT || Lundqvist || BB&T Center || 15,036 || 6–7–2 || 14 || Recap
|- style="background:#cfc;"
| 16 || November 6 || Columbus || 5–3 ||  || Lundqvist || Madison Square Garden || 17,348 || 7–7–2 || 16 || Recap
|- style="background:#cfc;"
| 17 || November 8 || Boston || 4–2 || || Lundqvist || Madison Square Garden || 18,006 || 8–7–2 || 18 ||  Recap
|- style="background:#cfc;"
| 18 || November 11 || Edmonton || 4–2 ||  || Lundqvist || Madison Square Garden || 18,006 || 9–7–2 || 20 || Recap
|- style="background:#fcc;"
| 19 || November 15 || @ Chicago || 3–6 ||  || Lundqvist || United Center || 21,528 || 9–8–2 || 20 || Recap
|- style="background:#fcc;"
| 20 || November 17 || @ Columbus || 0–2 ||  || Lundqvist || Nationwide Arena || 17,093 || 9–9–2 || 20 || Recap
|- style="background:#cfc;"
| 21 || November 19 || Ottawa || 3–0 ||  || Lundqvist || Madison Square Garden || 17,524 || 10–9–2 || 22 || Recap
|- style="background:#cfc;"
| 22 || November 22 || @ Carolina || 6–1 ||  || Lundqvist || PNC Arena || 11,398 || 11–9–2 || 24 || Recap
|- style="background:#cfc;"
| 23 || November 24 || Detroit || 2–1 || OT || Lundqvist || Madison Square Garden || 18,006 || 12–9–2 || 26 || Recap
|- style="background:#cfc;"
| 24 || November 26 || Vancouver || 4–3 || SO || Lundqvist || Madison Square Garden || 17,632 || 13–9–2 || 28 || Recap
|- style="background:#fcc;"
| 25 || November 28 || Florida || 4–5 ||  || Lundqvist || Madison Square Garden || 17,376 || 13–10–2 || 28 || Recap
|-

|- style="background:#cfc;"
| 26 || December 1 || Carolina || 5–1 ||  || Lundqvist || Madison Square Garden || 17,695 || 14–10–2 || 30 || Recap
|- style="background:#cfc;"
| 27 || December 5 || @ Pittsburgh || 4–3 ||  || Pavelec || PPG Paints Arena || 18,414 || 15–10–2 || 32 || Recap
|- style="background:#fcc;"
| 28 || December 8 || @ Washington || 2–4 ||  || Lundqvist || Capital One Arena || 18,506 || 15–11–2 || 32 || Recap
|- style="background:#cfc;"
| 29 || December 9 || New Jersey || 5–2 ||  || Lundqvist || Madison Square Garden || 18,006 || 16–11–2 || 34 || Recap
|- style="background:#fff;"
| 30 || December 11 || Dallas || 1–2 || SO || Pavelec || Madison Square Garden || 17,667 || 16–11–3 || 35 || Recap
|- style="background:#fcc;"
| 31 || December 13 || @ Ottawa || 2–3 ||  || Lundqvist || Canadian Tire Centre || 13,212 || 16–12–3 || 35 || Recap
|- style="background:#cfc;"
| 32 || December 15 || Los Angeles || 4–2 ||  || Lundqvist || Madison Square Garden || 17,756 || 17–12–3 || 37 || Recap
|- style="background:#cfc;"
| 33 || December 16 || @ Boston || 3–2 || OT || Lundqvist || TD Garden || 17,565 || 18–12–3 || 39 || Recap
|- style="background:#cfc;"
| 34 || December 19 || Anaheim || 4–1 ||  || Lundqvist || Madison Square Garden || 18,006 || 19–12–3 || 41 || Recap
|- style="background:#fff;"
| 35 || December 21 || @ New Jersey || 3–4 || SO || Lundqvist || Prudential Center || 16,514 || 19–12–4 || 42 || Recap
|- style="background:#fcc;"
| 36 || December 23 || Toronto || 2–3 ||  || Lundqvist || Madison Square Garden || 18,006 || 19–13–4 || 42 || Recap
|- style="background:#cfc;"
| 37 || December 27 || Washington || 1–0 || SO || Pavelec || Madison Square Garden || 18,006 || 20–13–4 || 44 || Recap
|- style="background:#fff;"
| 38 || December 29 || @ Detroit || 2–3 || SO || Lundqvist || Little Caesars Arena || 19,515 || 20–13–5 || 45 || Recap
|-

|- style="background:#cfc;"
| 39 || January 1 || @ Buffalo || 3–2 || OT || Lundqvist || Citi Field || 41,821(outdoors) || 21–13–5 || 47 || Recap
|- style="background:#fcc;"
| 40 || January 3 || Chicago || 2–5 ||  || Lundqvist || Madison Square Garden || 18,006 || 21–14–5 || 47 || Recap
|- style="background:#cfc;"
| 41 || January 6 || @ Arizona || 2–1 || SO || Lundqvist || Gila River Arena || 13,420 || 22–14–5 || 49 || Recap
|- style="background:#fcc;"
| 42 || January 7 || @ Vegas || 1–2 ||  || Pavelec || T-Mobile Arena || 18,234 || 22–15–5 || 49 || Recap
|- style="background:#fcc;"
| 43 || January 13 || NY Islanders || 2–7 ||  || Pavelec || Madison Square Garden || 18,006 || 22–16–5 || 49 || Recap
|- style="background:#fcc;"
| 44 || January 14 || @ Pittsburgh || 2–5 ||  || Lundqvist || PPG Paints Arena || 18,647 || 22–17–5 || 49 || Recap
|- style="background:#cfc;"
| 45 || January 16 || Philadelphia || 5–1 ||  || Lundqvist || Madison Square Garden || 18,006 || 23–17–5 || 51 || Recap
|- style="background:#cfc;"
| 46 || January 18 || Buffalo || 4–3 ||  || Lundqvist || Madison Square Garden || 18,006 || 24–17–5 || 53 || Recap
|- style="background:#fcc;"
| 47 || January 20 || @ Colorado || 1–3 ||  || Lundqvist || Pepsi Center || 18,056 || 24–18–5 || 53 || Recap
|- style="background:#fcc;"
| 48 || January 21 || @ Los Angeles || 2–4 ||  || Lundqvist || Staples Center || 18,230 || 24–19–5 || 53 || Recap
|- style="background:#fcc;"
| 49 || January 23 || @ Anaheim || 3–6 ||  || Pavelec || Honda Center || 16,763 || 24–20–5 || 53 || Recap
|- style="background:#cfc;"
| 50 || January 25 || @ San Jose || 6–5 ||  || Pavelec || SAP Center || 17,477 || 25–20–5 || 55 || Recap
|-

|- style="background:#fcc;"
| 51 || February 1 || Toronto || 0–4 ||  || Lundqvist || Madison Square Garden || 18,006 || 25–21–5 || 55 || Recap
|- style="background:#fcc;"
| 52 || February 3 || @ Nashville || 2–5 ||  || Lundqvist || Bridgestone Arena || 17,543 || 25–22–5 || 55 || Recap
|- style="background:#fcc;"
| 53 || February 5 || @ Dallas || 1–2 ||  || Lundqvist || American Airlines Center || 17,543 || 25–23–5 || 55 || Recap
|- style="background:#fcc;"
| 54 || February 7 || Boston || 1–6 ||  || Lundqvist || Madison Square Garden || 18,006 || 25–24–5 || 55 || Recap
|- style="background:#cfc;"
| 55 || February 9 || Calgary || 4–3 ||  || Lundqvist || Madison Square Garden || 18,006 || 26–24–5 || 57 || Recap
|- style="background:#cfc;"
| 56 || February 11 || @ Winnipeg || 3–1 ||  || Lundqvist || Bell MTS Place || 15,321 || 27–24–5 || 59 || Recap
|- style="background:#fcc;"
| 57 || February 13 || @ Minnesota || 2–3 ||  || Lundqvist || Xcel Energy Center || 18,887 || 27–25–5 || 59 || Recap
|- style="background:#fcc;"
| 58 || February 15 || @ NY Islanders || 0–3 ||  || Lundqvist || Barclays Center || 15,795 || 27–26–5 || 59 || Recap
|- style="background:#fcc;"
| 59 || February 17 || @ Ottawa || 3–6 ||  || Lundqvist || Canadian Tire Centre || 17,259 || 27–27–5 || 59 || Recap
|- style="background:#fcc;"
| 60 || February 18 || Philadelphia || 4–7 ||  || Lundqvist || Madison Square Garden || 18,006 || 27–28–5 || 59 || Recap
|- style="background:#fcc;"
| 61 || February 22 || @ Montreal || 1–3 ||  || Georgiev || Bell Centre || 21,302 || 27–29–5 || 59 || Recap
|- style="background:#fcc;"
| 62 || February 23 || Minnesota || 1–4 ||  || Georgiev || Madison Square Garden || 18,006 || 27–30–5 || 59 || Recap
|- style="background:#fff;"
| 63 || February 25 || Detroit || 2–3 || OT || Lundqvist || Madison Square Garden || 18,006 || 27–30–6 || 60 || Recap
|- style="background:#cfc;"
| 64 || February 28 || @ Vancouver || 6–5 || OT || Lundqvist || Rogers Arena || 18,044 || 28–30–6 || 62 || Recap
|-

|- style="background:#cfc;"
| 65 || March 2 || @ Calgary || 3–1 ||  || Lundqvist || Scotiabank Saddledome || 19,143 || 29–30–6 || 64 || Recap
|- style="background:#cfc;"
| 66 || March 3 || @ Edmonton || 3–2 ||  || Georgiev || Rogers Place || 18,347 || 30–30–6 || 66 || Recap
|- style="background:#fcc;"
| 67 || March 6 || Winnipeg || 0–3 ||  || Lundqvist || Madison Square Garden || 18,006 || 30–31–6 || 66 || Recap
|- style="background:#fcc;"
| 68 || March 8 || @ Tampa Bay || 3–5 ||  || Lundqvist || Amalie Arena || 19,092 || 30–32–6 || 66 || Recap
|- style="background:#fff;"
| 69 || March 10 || @ Florida || 3–4 || SO || Lundqvist || BB&T Center || 16,712 || 30–32–7 || 67 || Recap
|- style="background:#cfc;"
| 70 || March 12 || Carolina || 6–3 ||  || Georgiev || Madison Square Garden || 17,679 || 31–32–7 || 69 || Recap
|- style="background:#cfc;"
| 71 || March 14 || Pittsburgh || 4–3 || OT || Georgiev || Madison Square Garden || 17,379 || 32–32–7 || 71 || Recap
|- style="background:#fff;"
| 72 || March 17 || @ St. Louis || 3–4 || OT || Georgiev || Scottrade Center || 18,975 || 32–32–8 || 72 || Recap
|- style="background:#fcc;"
| 73 || March 20 || Columbus || 3–5 ||  || Lundqvist || Madison Square Garden || 17,194 || 32–33–8 || 72 || Recap
|- style="background:#fcc;"
| 74 || March 22 || @ Philadelphia || 3–4 ||  || Georgiev || Wells Fargo Center || 19,584 || 32–34–8 || 72 || Recap
|- style="background:#cfc;"
| 75 || March 24 || Buffalo || 5–1 ||  || Georgiev || Madison Square Garden || 18,006 || 33–34–8 || 74 || Recap
|- style="background:#fcc;"
| 76 || March 26 || Washington || 2–4 ||  || Georgiev || Madison Square Garden || 18,006 || 33–35–8 || 74 || Recap
|- style="background:#fff;"
| 77 || March 28 || @ Washington || 2–3 || OT || Lundqvist || Capital One Arena || 18,506 || 33–35–9 || 75 || Recap
|- style="background:#fcc;"
| 78 || March 30 || Tampa Bay || 3–7 ||  || Pavelec || Madison Square Garden || 18,006 || 33–36–9 || 75 || Recap
|- style="background:#cfc;"
| 79 || March 31 || @ Carolina || 2–1 ||  || Lundqvist || PNC Arena || 14,993 || 34–36–9 || 77 || Recap
|-

|- style="background:#fcc;"
| 80 || April 3 || @ New Jersey || 2–5 ||  || Lundqvist || Prudential Center || 16,514 || 34–37–9 || 77 || Recap
|- style="background:#fcc;"
| 81 || April 5 || @ NY Islanders || 1–2 ||  || Pavelec || Barclays Center || 14,152 || 34–38–9 || 77 || Recap
|- style="background:#fcc;"
| 82 || April 7 || @ Philadelphia || 0–5 ||  || Lundqvist || Wells Fargo Center || 20,028 || 34–39–9 || 77 || Recap
|-

|-
|

Player statistics
As of April 7, 2018
Skaters

Goaltenders

Awards and honors

Milestones

Records

Transactions
The Rangers have been involved in the following transactions during the 2017–18 season.

Trades

Notes:
 New York to retain 50% of salary as part of trade.
 Boston to retain 50% of salary as part of trade.

Free agents acquired

Free agents lost

Claimed via waivers

Lost via waivers

Players released

Lost via retirement

Player signings

Draft picks

Below are the New York Rangers' selections at the 2017 NHL Entry Draft, which was held on June 23 and 24, 2017, at the United Center in Chicago, Illinois.

Notes:
 The Arizona Coyotes' first-round pick went to the New York Rangers as the result of a trade on June 23, 2017, that sent Derek Stepan and Antti Raanta to Arizona in exchange for Anthony DeAngelo and this pick.
 The Nashville Predators' fourth-round pick went to the New York Rangers as the result of a trade on June 24, 2017, that sent Florida's fourth-round pick in 2017 (102nd overall) to San Jose in exchange for a sixth-round pick in 2017 (174th overall) and this pick.
 The Vancouver Canucks' sixth-round pick went to the New York Rangers as the result of a trade on January 8, 2016 that sent Emerson Etem to Vancouver in exchange for Nicklas Jensen and this pick.
 The San Jose Sharks' sixth-round pick went to the New York Rangers as the result of a trade on June 24, 2017, that sent Florida's fourth-round pick in 2017 (102nd overall) to San Jose in exchange for Nashville's fourth-round pick in 2017 (123rd overall) and this pick.

References

New York Rangers seasons
New York Rangers
New York Rangers
New York Rangers
New York Rangers
 in Manhattan
Madison Square Garden